RV1 may refer to:
 Chrysler RV1 Valiant, a passenger car
 London Buses route RV1
 Mandala 1, the first mandala of the Rigveda
 RV-1 Mohawk, a reconnaissance aircraft
 RV-1 nuclear reactor, a Venezuelan research reactor
 Toyota RV-1, a concept vehicle
 VanGrunsven RV-1, a homebuilt aircraft
 Sonata No. 6 in A Major, RV 1, from Antonio Vivaldi's Twelve Trio Sonatas, Op. 2